Mogogelo is a town in Moretele Local Municipality in the North West province of South Africa.

References

Populated places in the Moretele Local Municipality